Ostry is a stratovolcano located in the northern part of the Kamchatka Peninsula, Russia. It comprises the higher Ostry volcano and the smaller Kutina volcano. Ostry is one of the highest peaks of Sredinny Range.

See also
 List of volcanoes in Russia

References 

Mountains of the Kamchatka Peninsula
Volcanoes of the Kamchatka Peninsula
Stratovolcanoes of Russia
Holocene stratovolcanoes